The 1917–18 Illinois Fighting Illini men's basketball team represented the University of Illinois.

Regular season
Under the direction of coach Ralph Jones, the 1917–18 season for the Illinois Fighting Illini men's basketball team, was unusual because World War I was happening in Europe.  Co-captain George Halas, for example, left the team in January 1918 to help out with the war effort.  In only the second season of having 10 members, the  Big Ten Conference continued their 12-game schedule of home and road competitions.  The Illini finished their season with an overall record of 9 wins and 6 losses and a 6 win 6 loss conference mark.  The starting lineup included co-captain Earl Anderson and B.E. Mittleman at the forward positions, J.S. Probst and P.C. Taylor at center, and co-captain George Halas and Burt Ingwersen as guards. Anderson would be named a consensus All-American for the season.

Roster

Source

Schedule
												
Source																

|-	
!colspan=12 style="background:#DF4E38; color:white;"| Non-Conference regular season
|- align="center" bgcolor=""

			

|-	
!colspan=9 style="background:#DF4E38; color:#FFFFFF;"|Big Ten regular season

Bold Italic connotes conference game

Player stats

Awards and honors
George Halas was enshrined in the Pro Football Hall of Fame (1963), for his role in the development of the National Football League as well as for his coaching and playing for the Chicago Bears.

Earl Anderson was named a Consensus All-American for the 1917-18 season.

References

Illinois Fighting Illini
Illinois Fighting Illini men's basketball seasons
1917 in sports in Illinois
1918 in sports in Illinois